Nyong-et-Mfoumou is a department of Centre Province in Cameroon. The department covers an area of 6,172 km and as of 2001 had a total population of 130,321. The capital of the department lies at Akonolinga.

Subdivisions
The department is divided administratively into five communes and in turn into villages.

Communes 
 Akonolinga
 Ayos
 Endom
 Kobdombo
 Mengang

References

Departments of Cameroon
Centre Region (Cameroon)